The Metropolitan Railway D Class was a group of six  locomotives built for the Metropolitan Railway in 1894-1895 by Sharp, Stewart and Company.

Overview
Two locomotives were used on the Verney Junction-Aylesbury section. The other four ran between Aylesbury and Baker Street and were fitted with condensing apparatus, but this was later removed.

Withdrawal
The class was withdrawn starting in 1920. Some were sold, while others were scrapped, but none were ultimately preserved.

References

External links 
 http://www.railwayarchive.org.uk/stories/getobjectstory.php?rnum=L2597&enum=LE130&pnum=13&maxp=18

D
2-4-0T locomotives
Railway locomotives introduced in 1895
Sharp Stewart locomotives
Standard gauge steam locomotives of Great Britain
Scrapped locomotives